Jeffrey Donald "Jeff" Viggiano (born July 24, 1984) is a retired American-born Italian professional basketball player who last played for Umana Reyer Venezia of the Lega Basket Serie A.

High school and college career
Viggiano played high school basketball at Suffield, in West Suffield, Connecticut. In high school, Viggiano won the 2000 Gatorade Player of the Year in the state of Connecticut, as well as the Connecticut State Championship alongside teammate Dan Presser. He then played 4 seasons of college basketball at the University of Massachusetts Amherst, with the UMass Minutemen.

Club career
After he played in Sweden and Hungary with Norrköping Dolphins and Soproni Sördögök KC, in 2008 Jeff was signed by Italian LegADue team Nuova Pallacanestro Pavia. That year he averaged 14.1 points and 4.2 rebounds per game and gained the call of powerhouse Armani Jeans Milano. In August 2010, he goes on one-year loan to Angelico Biella. In December 2011 he signed with Benetton Treviso. In July 2012, he signed a one-year deal with Enel Brindisi.

On August 30, 2013, he signed with Montepaschi Siena for the 2013–14 season. On July 1, 2014, he signed with Umana Reyer Venezia for the 2014–15 season. On July 16, 2015, he re-signed with Venezia for one more season. On July 1, 2016, he again re-signed with Venezia.

References

External links
  Euroleague.net Profile
 Legabasket.it Profile

1984 births
Living people
American expatriate basketball people in Hungary
American expatriate basketball people in Italy
American expatriate basketball people in Sweden
American men's basketball players
American people of Italian descent
Basketball players from Connecticut
Italian men's basketball players
Lega Basket Serie A players
Mens Sana Basket players
New Basket Brindisi players
Norrköping Dolphins players
Olimpia Milano players
Pallacanestro Biella players
Pallacanestro Treviso players
Reyer Venezia players
Soproni KC players
UMass Minutemen basketball players
Small forwards